"Take Me in Your Arms"  is a song by freestyle singer Lil Suzy. Released as a single in 1991 from the album Love Can't Wait, it reached No. 67 on the Billboard Hot 100 and No. 4 on the Canadian dance chart.

Tracks
 Germany CD single

 US 12" single

Charts

Weekly charts

Year-end charts

References

1991 singles
Lil Suzy songs
1991 songs